Hyaleucerea leucosticta is a moth of the subfamily Arctiinae. It was described by Druce in 1905. It is found in Venezuela.

References

Euchromiina
Moths described in 1905